Ochrodota tessellata is a moth of the subfamily Arctiinae first described by Rothschild in 1909. It is found in Brazil and Peru.

References

Phaegopterina